Ravenstein may refer to:

Places
Ravenstein, Germany in the district Neckar-Odenwald, Baden-Württemberg
Ravenstein, Netherlands in Oss, North Brabant
Ravenstein railway station

Films 
Ravenstein  a 2020 British Horror film

People with the surname
Adolph of Cleves, Lord of Ravenstein (1425–1492), noble from the Low Countries
Philip of Cleves, Lord of Ravenstein (1459–1528), his son and successor 
Johann von Ravenstein, Lieutenant in World War I and Lieutenant general in the Wehrmacht during World War II
Ernst Georg Ravenstein (a.k.a. Ernest George Ravenstein), Anglo-German geographer and athletics promoter